"Start the Fire" was the final Alcazar single, released in 2005 as a second single from their compilation album Dancefloor Deluxe, before their three-year hiatus. The chorus is borrowed from Billy Joel's classic hit "We Didn't Start the Fire", though the verses are completely new. It also features samples from Heartache # 9 of Delegation. The maxi single contains two previously unreleased tracks "Glamourama" and "Nothing But the Video On". These tracks are rumoured to have been recorded for a third Alcazar studio album.

The track reached #10 in Sweden, and, randomly enough #87 in Switzerland.

Music video
A music video was produced to promote the single. During the filming of the video, one of the lead singers, Annikafiore broke her foot.  Therefore, she was only shown in certain scenes of the music video (the ones shot before the injury).

Formats and track listings
These are the formats and track listings of promotional single releases of "Start the Fire".

CD Single
 Start The Fire (Original Version)
 Nothing But The Video On (previously unreleased)

Maxi Single
 Start The Fire (Original Version)
 Glamourama (previously unreleased)
 Nothing But the Video On (previously unreleased)
 Start The Fire (Extended Version)
 Physical (Poolbreeze Mix)
 Start The Fire (Acapella)

Chart performance

References

Alcazar (band) songs
2005 singles
RCA Records singles
2005 songs
Songs written by Billy Joel